Advanced Info Service Public Company Limited (AIS) is Thailand's largest GSM mobile phone operator with 39.87 million customers as of Q3 2016. Founded in April 1985, AIS started off as a computer rental business. In October 1990, it launched analog 900 MHz mobile phone services with a 20-year monopoly concession from the Telephone Organization of Thailand (TOT), and later became the first company allowed to operate on the GSM-900 frequency. It acquired Shinawatra Paging in June 1992.

The company is controlled by the Intouch Holdings (formerly Shin Corporation), headed by Temasek Holdings, a Singapore government-owned agency. As of 23 December 2011, Intouch holds 40.45 percent of the shares of the company and Singapore Telecommunications (also majority-held by Temasek) together with Thai Trust Fund and OCBC Nominees holds a 23.32 percent stake.

Temasek bought the AIS brand through the 2006 acquisition of the Shin Corporation from ousted former Prime Minister Thaksin Shinawatra.

In February 2014, in a conflict between the People's Democratic Reform Committee (PRDC) and Shinawatra, the PDRC called for a boycott of AIS, wrongly believing it to be owned by the Shinawatra family.

Subsidiaries
 Advanced Contact Center Company Limited (ACC) – operate AIS Call Center 1175 and 1148
 Advanced Datanetwork Communications Company Limited (ADC) – provide online data communication service via telephone lines under the name "Datanet", licensed by TOT
 DataNetwork Solutions Company Limited (DNS) – provide online data communication service via telephone lines under the name "Datanet" in the provincial area
 mPay – payment processing and e-wallet service

mPay
mPay, an AIS subsidiary, is a payment processor and one of Thailand's three major payment service providers. Its partners include CIMB and 2C2P.

According to a 2014 article in The Nation, mPay has around 1.6 million registered users, of which roughly 1.2 million are end-users and 400,000 are mPay agents. 150,000 of mPay's end-users use the service monthly, spending on average 30,000 baht. In November 2015, four million people in Thailand used mPay, and in August 2013, mPay had around 700 merchant partners.

Services and coverage 
As of August 2019, AIS is the largest network in Thailand, with 40.1 million subscribers. In addition to post pay services, AIS offers prepaid services under the 1-2-Call brand.

Currently (2020) data is sold in time-based, volume-based and unlimited packages.

AIS operates 2G , 3G WCDMA/HSPA+, LTE, 5G NR, NB-IoT, and eMTC networks.

Wi-Fi hotspots 

AIS owns and operates more than 100,000 Wi-Fi hotspots under the name "AIS SUPER WIFI."

Next G 

In 2017 AIS announced it has teamed up with Samsung Electronics to combine Wi-Fi and LTE in a gigabit-speed mobile service called AIS Next G. The new network is estimated to be 15 times faster than the existing LTE and four times faster than the tri-band LTE-A, the fastest wireless network currently available in Thailand.

AIS Play 

AIS also provides online multiplatform entertainment, business and financial services called AIS Play that was launched on 1 February 2017. AIS Play is the first Thai OTT TV with 4K resolution, VOD and more than 100 popular channels. The current channel lineup is:

Following with Warner Bros. Discovery Asia-Pacific:
 Warner TV
 HLN
 Cartoon Network
 CNN International
 Discovery Asia
 Discovery Channel
 Animal Planet
 TLC
 Asian Food Channel
 Food Network Asia
 Eurosport

Following With Paramount Global (Asia) 
 Nickelodeon (Include On Demand)
 Nick Jr. (Include On Demand)
 Paramount Network
 Paramount+ (On Demand Only)
 Paramount Pictures (On Demand Only)

Following with Rock Entertainment:
 Rock Entertainment
 Rock Extreme
 Love Nature

Following with BBC Studios 
 BBC World News
 BBC Lifestyle
 BBC First (On Demand, TBA)

Other Channels:
 EGG Network
 Edge Sports
 beIN Sports (1-5)
 Golf Channel Thailand (A-la-carte)
 Techstorm
 HITS
 HITS Movies

On Demand Brand
 TIGA
 GDH

Subscription Apps
 Disney+ Hotstar (Exclusive Disney+ Hotstar privilege is for AIS customers and AIS Fibre customers who use AIS mobile number)
 Viu
 beIN Sports Connect
 WeTV
 AIS Karaoke
 Netflix
 MONO MAX

Freemium channels:
 NHK World Japan
 France 24
 Boomerang
 CNA
 DW
 Euronews
 Doonee by AIS (On Demand)
 Zee Nung
 Al Jazeera English
 Arirang TV
 TV5MONDE Asie

There's over 100 free to air channels, including some Local channels, available to stream.

In 2021 AIS partnered with Thai League 1, Thailand's top-tier football league, to broadcast their matches through their AIS Play application. The deal will cover the whole 2021–2022 season and will also include matches played in the lower Thai league, Thai League 2 and Thai League 3. Additionally, the Thai FA CUP will also be broadcast by AIS on AIS Play.

At present, most of the business halls of AIS has mainly promoted and sold Apple TV products, and equipped with AIS Play soft terminal applications.

Company logo

References

External links

Companies established in 1986
Mobile phone companies of Thailand
Intouch Holdings
Companies listed on the Stock Exchange of Thailand
1986 establishments in Thailand
Thai brands
SET50 Index